Sirtuin 1, also known as NAD-dependent deacetylase sirtuin-1, is a protein that in humans is encoded by the SIRT1 gene.

SIRT1 stands for sirtuin (silent mating type information regulation 2 homolog) 1 (S. cerevisiae), referring to the fact that its sirtuin homolog (biological equivalent across species) in yeast (Saccharomyces cerevisiae) is Sir2.  SIRT1 is an enzyme located primarily in the cell nucleus that deacetylates transcription factors that contribute to cellular regulation (reaction to stressors, longevity).

Function 

Sirtuin 1 is a member of the sirtuin family of proteins, homologs of the Sir2 gene in S. cerevisiae. Members of the sirtuin family are characterized by a sirtuin core domain and grouped into four classes. The functions of human sirtuins have not yet been determined; however, yeast sirtuin proteins are known to regulate epigenetic gene silencing and suppress recombination of rDNA. Studies suggest that the human sirtuins may function as intracellular regulatory proteins with mono-ADP-ribosyltransferase activity. The protein encoded by this gene is included in class I of the sirtuin family.

Sirtuin 1 is downregulated in cells that have high insulin resistance and inducing its expression increases insulin sensitivity, suggesting the molecule is associated with improving insulin sensitivity. Furthermore, SIRT1 was shown to de-acetylate and affect the activity of both members of the PGC1-alpha/ERR-alpha complex, which are essential metabolic regulatory transcription factors.

In mammals, SIRT1 has been shown to deacetylate and thereby deactivate the p53 protein. SIRT1 also stimulates autophagy by preventing acetylation of proteins (via deacetylation) required for autophagy as demonstrated in cultured cells and embryonic and neonatal tissues. This function provides a link between sirtuin expression and the cellular response to limited nutrients due to caloric restriction.

SIRT1 plays a role in activating T helper 17 cells, which contribute to autoimmune disease; efforts to activate SIRT1 therapeutically may trigger or exacerbate autoimmune disease.

SIRT1, along with HDAC1 and the AP-1 promoter complex within D1-type dopaminergic medium spiny neurons, appears to be closely involved in the pathogenesis of addiction.

Role in Major depressive disorder
SNP (rs10997875) in the Sirt1 gene could play a role in major depressive disorder pathophysiology. It was also found that there is a link between the Sirt1 gene (rs3758391) and depressive disorders. Further, it has been shown that Sirt1 expression in the peripheral blood from individuals with depression is significantly less than those in healthy subjects.

Selective ligands

Activators 
 Lamin A is a protein that had been identified as a direct activator of Sirtuin 1 during a study on progeria.
 Resveratrol has been claimed to be an activator of Sirtuin 1, but this effect has been disputed based on the fact that the initially used activity assay, using a non-physiological substrate peptide, can produce artificial results. Resveratrol increases the expression of SIRT1, meaning that it does increase the activity of SIRT1, though not necessarily by direct activation. However, resveratrol was later shown to directly activate Sirtuin 1 against non-modified peptide substrates. Resveratrol also enhances the binding between Sirtuin 1 and Lamin A. In addition to resveratrol, a range of other plant-derived polyphenols have also been shown to interact with SIRT1.
 SRT-1720 was also claimed to be an activator, but this now has been questioned.
 Methylene blue by increasing NAD+/NADH ratio.
Metformin activates both PRKA and SIRT1.

Although neither resveratrol or SRT1720 directly activate SIRT1, resveratrol, and probably SRT1720, indirectly activate SIRT1 by activation of AMP-activated protein kinase (AMPK), which increases NAD+ levels (which is the cofactor required for SIRT1 activity). Elevating NAD+ is a more direct and reliable way to activate SIRT1.

Interactions 

Sirtuin 1 has been shown to interact with HEY2, PGC1-alpha, ERR-alpha, and AIRE.  Mir-132 microRNA has been reported to interact with Sirtuin 1 mRNA, so as to reduce protein expression. This has been linked to insulin resistance in the obese.

Human Sirt1 has been reported having 136 direct interactions in interactomic studies involved in numerous processes.

Both SIRT1 and PARP1 have a roughly equal affinity for the NAD+ that both enzymes require for activity. But DNA damage can increase levels of PARP1 more than 100-fold, leaving little NAD+ for SIRT1.

Sir2
Sir2 (whose homolog in mammals is known as SIRT1) was the first gene of the sirtuin genes to be found.  It was found in budding yeast, and, since then, members of this highly conserved family have been found in nearly all organisms studied. Sirtuins are hypothesized to play a key role in an organism's response to stresses (such as heat or starvation) and to be responsible for the lifespan-extending effects of calorie restriction.

The three letter yeast gene symbol Sir stands for Silent Information Regulator while the number 2 is representative of the fact that it was the second SIR gene discovered and characterized.

In the roundworm, Caenorhabditis elegans, Sir-2.1 is used to denote the gene product most similar to yeast Sir2 in structure and activity.

Method of action and observed effects
Sirtuins act primarily by removing acetyl groups from lysine residues within proteins in the presence of NAD+; thus, they are classified as "NAD+-dependent deacetylases" and have EC number 3.5.1. They add the acetyl group from the protein to the ADP-ribose component of NAD+ to form O-acetyl-ADP-ribose. The HDAC activity of Sir2 results in tighter packaging of chromatin and a reduction in transcription at the targeted gene locus. The silencing activity of Sir2 is most prominent at telomeric sequences, the hidden MAT loci (HM loci), and the ribosomal DNA (rDNA) locus (RDN1) from which ribosomal RNA is transcribed.

Limited overexpression of the Sir2 gene results in a lifespan extension of about 30%, if the lifespan is measured as the number of cell divisions the mother cell can undergo before cell death. Concordantly, deletion of Sir2 results in a 50% reduction in lifespan. In particular, the silencing activity of Sir2, in complex with Sir3 and Sir4, at the HM loci prevents simultaneous expression of both mating factors which can cause sterility and shortened lifespan. Additionally, Sir2 activity at the rDNA locus is correlated with a decrease in the formation of rDNA circles. Chromatin silencing, as a result of Sir2 activity, reduces homologous recombination between rDNA repeats, which is the process leading to the formation of rDNA circles. As accumulation of these rDNA circles is the primary way in which yeast are believed to "age", then the action of Sir2 in preventing accumulation of these rDNA circles is a necessary factor in yeast longevity.

Starving of yeast cells leads to a similarly extended lifespan, and indeed starving increases the available amount of NAD+ and reduces nicotinamide, both of which have the potential to increase the activity of Sir2. Furthermore, removing the Sir2 gene eliminates the life-extending effect of caloric restriction. Experiments in the nematode Caenorhabditis elegans and in the fruit fly Drosophila melanogaster support these findings. , experiments in mice are underway.

However, some other findings call the above interpretation into question. If one measures the lifespan of a yeast cell as the amount of time it can live in a non-dividing stage, then silencing the Sir2 gene actually increases lifespan  Furthermore, calorie restriction can substantially prolong reproductive lifespan in yeast even in the absence of Sir2.

In organisms more complicated than yeast, it appears that Sir2 acts by deacetylation of several other proteins besides histones.

In the fruit fly Drosophila melanogaster, the Sir2 gene does not seem to be essential; loss of a sirtuin gene has only very subtle effects. However, mice lacking the SIRT1 gene (the sir2 biological equivalent) were smaller than normal at birth, often died early or became sterile.

Inhibition of SIRT1
Human aging is characterized by a chronic, low-grade inflammation level, and the pro-inflammatory transcription factor  NF-κB is the main transcriptional regulator of genes related to inflammation. SIRT1 inhibits NF-κB-regulated gene expression by deacetylating the RelA/p65 subunit of NF-κB at lysine 310. But NF-κB more strongly inhibits SIRT1.  NF-κB increases the levels of the microRNA miR-34a (which inhibits nicotinamide adenine dinucleotide NAD+ synthesis) by binding to its promoter region. resulting in lower levels of SIRT1.

Both the SIRT1 enzyme and the poly ADP-ribose polymerase 1 (PARP1) enzyme require NAD+ for activation. PARP1 is a DNA repair enzyme, so in conditions of high DNA damage, NAD+ levels can be reduced 20-30% thereby reducing SIRT1 activity.

Homologous recombination

SIRT1 protein actively promotes homologous recombination (HR) in human cells, and  likely promotes recombinational repair of DNA breaks. SIRT1 mediated HR requires the WRN protein. WRN protein functions in double-strand break repair by HR. WRN protein is a RecQ helicase, and in its mutated form gives rise to Werner syndrome, a genetic condition in humans characterized by numerous features of premature aging. These findings link SIRT1 function to HR, a DNA repair process that is likely necessary for maintaining the integrity of the genome during aging.

References

External links 
 Corante weblog by Derek Lowe about sir2 and SIRT1 research.
 
 

EC 3.5.1
Aging-related proteins
Aging-related enzymes